Dalibor Matanić (born 21 January 1975) is a Croatian filmmaker.

His most well-known film is the 2002 feature Fine Dead Girls which won the Special Jury Prize at the 2003 Sochi film festival. His 2015 film The High Sun was screened in the Un Certain Regard section at the 2015 Cannes Film Festival where it won the Jury Prize.

He is married to Helena Minić and they have two children.

Filmography
2000: Cashier Wants to Go to the Seaside (Blagajnica hoće ići na more) – writer and director
2002: Fine Dead Girls (Fine mrtve djevojke) – co-writer and director
2004: 100 Minutes of Glory (100 minuta slave) – director
2005: I Love You (Volim te) – writer and director
2008: The Lika Cinema (Kino Lika) – co-writer and director
2010: Mother of Asphalt (Majka asfalta) – writer and director
2011: Daddy (Ćaća) – writer and director
2013: Handymen (Majstori) – writer and director
2015: The High Sun (Zvizdan) – writer and director
2016: The Paper (Novine) - director
2017: Exorcism (Egzorcizam) – writer and director

References

External links
 

Dalibor Matanić at film.hr 

Croatian film directors
Living people
1975 births
Golden Arena for Best Director winners
Artists from Zagreb